Fat Bastard is a fictional character in the second and third films of the Austin Powers series. A morbidly obese henchman hailing from Clydebank, Scotland, Fat Bastard serves Dr. Evil in his quest to destroy Austin Powers. The character is portrayed by Mike Myers.

His extreme size and weight (1 tonne, according to Dr. Evil) endows Fat Bastard with massive strength. He exhibits this prowess in the sumo ring during the third movie.

Fat Bastard is noted for his foul temper, his emotional monologues that culminate in flatulence, his vulgar, crude manners, and his unusual diet. These go as far as to include a cannibalistic taste for human infants and people with dwarfism, whom he calls "the other, other white meat". In Austin Powers: The Spy Who Shagged Me, he boasts that he once ate a baby, and tries to refuse Dr. Evil's money for his services in exchange for getting to eat Mini-Me.

The character utilizes many tropes associated with a very negative view of fat people, namely that they are greedy, obsessed with eating, possibly cannibalistic, and grotesque.

Appearances

Austin Powers: The Spy Who Shagged Me
Fat Bastard had stolen Austin's mojo in 1969, as he is a guard in the facility, and has knocked out the other guards using bagpipes that spray gas, leaving Austin impotent in 1999. After seducing and sleeping with Fat Bastard, secret agent—and Austin's ally—Felicity Shagwell (Heather Graham) places a homing device in his rectum. During this time with Felicity, Fat Bastard is also eating a whole chicken while in bed with her. However, the device is ineffective, lost and left in a toilet before he returns to Dr. Evil's island. However, traces of rare vegetables are found in a stool sample, enabling the island to be tracked down. Fat Bastard often declares himself "dead sexy", but he is really hiding his true feelings of rejection from society. During an assassination attempt against Austin and Felicity in 1999, Fat Bastard dresses as a package delivery man and literally breaks in through the front door. When Felicity asks if he is happy, Fat Bastard has an emotional breakdown, tearfully confessing "I eat because I'm unhappy, and I'm unhappy because I eat. It's a vicious cycle. Now if you'll excuse me, there's someone I need to get in touch with and forgive. Myself." He then farts, which makes Austin and Felicity disgusted. Fat Bastard is slightly embarrassed and says "Sorry, I farted. Cm It's a long road ahead". He then changes his mind and decides to kill them both anyway. Before he can, Felicity incapacitates him by kicking Fat Bastard in the Testicles, he groans  and calls his Scrotum “ the mommy daddy button “ she tells him she did it for insulting her sexual prowess and  he faints shaking the whole room in the process.

Austin Powers in Goldmember
In the next film, Fat Bastard retires from being a henchman and relocates to Japan. There, he becomes a sumo wrestler and, despite trying to go straight, he still carries out the occasional job for Dr. Evil. During his bathroom time, Foxxy Cleopatra and Austin sneak in using a disguise and catch him. Austin starts shouting to him "You really are a Fat Bastard"; to which he replies "You know that hurts my feelings. I've tried going on a diet, you know". Fat Bastard then says he did the Zone diet, stating that "carbs are the enemy", though the Zone diet promotes equal amounts of carbs and protein and Fat Bastard probably meant the Atkins diet, which emphasizes low carbs. After tearfully telling Austin and Foxxy that he's happy as a sumo wrestler, he farts. Austin asks him if he soiled himself. Fat Bastard replies "maybe" and laughs. He then jokes about how it sounded wet and smells it. He is disgusted by how it smells, stating it smells like "Carrots and throw up".

By the end of Austin Powers in Goldmember, he has lost his excessive weight, crediting it to the Subway diet, even citing Jared Fogle as a hero. However, he points out that he still has a lot of excess skin, further noting the resemblance of his neck to a vagina. On the film audio commentary, Mike Myers says that Fat Bastard probably will not stay thin (as "Thin Bastard", as he called him) and would most likely return to his overweight state.

Popular culture
 Beginning in June 2006, this character was in a DirecTV commercial with Mini-Me. The plot was that he was talking about how Mini-Me was looking good to eat, like in the movies (see above). Mini-Me thinks that he is crazy. He also uses two of his lines from the movie. His famous line in this commercial is "Come on, get in my belly!"
 On an episode of Power Rangers Lightspeed Rescue titled "In the Freeze Zone", the monster Freezard references Fat Bastard by saying "Get in my Belly!". Michael Chaturantabut who played Chad Lee the Blue Lightspeed Ranger, would make a cameo appearance in Austin Powers in Goldmember, as a gunman at the pool area.
 On an episode of WWF SmackDown! (aired Thursday, April 13, 2000), Professional wrestler, The Big Show dresses as Fat Bastard and reveals what's under the kilt, much to Kurt Angle's disgusted chagrin. Commentator Michael Cole suggested it was a thong.

Censorship
In reviews for the movie in the newspapers, film critic Roger Ebert referred to him as "We can't even say his name!", while others called him "Obese Illegitimate Child".

The mass retail action figures sold of the character had the name "Fat Man" on the box, even though the patch on his blazer clearly displayed "FB". Specialty stores such as comic book shops had figures in packaging which referred to him as "Fat Bastard", however.

References

External links

Austin Powers characters
Fictional British Army personnel
Fictional characters without a name
Film characters introduced in 1999
Fictional henchmen
Fictional cannibals
Fictional Scottish people
Fictional sumo wrestlers
Male film villains
Film supervillains
Film and television memes